WOSH (1490 AM) is a radio station serving the Oshkosh, Wisconsin area with a news/talk format including the ABC News Radio network. This station is under ownership of Cumulus Media.

The station began broadcasting on December 31, 1941. During the late 1960s until 1975, WOSH was the leading Top 40 radio station in the Appleton-Oshkosh market, with Jonathon Brandmeier as the station's star disc jockey.

On August 1, 1975, AM 1490's callsign was changed from WOSH to WYTL, and its format changed from top 40 to modern country. This change was advertised as a "frequency swap" to listeners, where WYTL-FM "moved" along with its country format to AM 1490, and WOSH-AM "moved" to FM 103.9 with its top 40 format.

In 1984, the call sign WOSH was reinstated to 1490 and the current news/talk format established.

References

External links
FCC History Cards for WOSH
WOSH NewsTalk 93.9 1490 - Official website

News and talk radio stations in the United States
OSH
Radio stations established in 1980
Cumulus Media radio stations